John Greville Agard Pocock  (born 7 March 1924) is a New Zealand historian of political thought. He is especially known for his studies of republicanism in the early modern period (mostly in Europe, Britain, and America), his work on the history of English common law, his treatment of Edward Gibbon and other Enlightenment historians, and, in historical method, for his contributions to the history of political discourse.

Born in England, Pocock spent most of his early life in New Zealand. He moved to the United States in 1966, where since 1975 he has been a tenured professor at Johns Hopkins University in Baltimore. He is a member of both the American Academy of Arts and Sciences and the American Philosophical Society.

Early life and career
Pocock was born in London on 7 March 1924, but in 1927 moved with his family to New Zealand where his father, Greville Pocock, was appointed professor of Classics at Canterbury College. He later moved to University of Cambridge, earning his PhD in 1952 under the tutelage of Herbert Butterfield.  He returned to New Zealand to teach at Canterbury University College from 1946 to 1948, and to lecture at the University of Otago from 1953 to 1955.  In 1959, he established and chaired the Department of Political Science at the University of Canterbury.  He moved to the US in 1966, where he became the William Eliot Smith professor of history at Washington University in St. Louis, Missouri.  In 1975 Pocock assumed his present position at Johns Hopkins University, Baltimore.  he holds the position of the Harry C. Black Emeritus Professor of History.

His first book, entitled The Ancient Constitution and the Feudal Law examined the workings and origins of common law mind, showing how thinkers such as the English jurist Edward Coke (1552–1634) built up a historical analysis of British history into an epistemology of law and politics; and how that edifice later came to be subverted by scholars of the middle to late seventeenth century. Some of this work has since been revised.

Later work
By the 1970s Pocock had changed his focus from how lawyers understood the evolution of law to how philosophers and theologians did. The Machiavellian Moment (1975), a widely acclaimed volume, showed how Florentines, Englishmen, and Americans had responded to and analysed the destruction of their states and political orders in a succession of crises sweeping through the early modern world. Again, not all historians accept Pocock's account, but leading scholars of early modern republicanism show its influence – especially in their characterisation of political theorist James Harrington (1611–1677) as a salient historical actor.

Subsequent research by Pocock explores the literary world inhabited by the British historian Edward Gibbon (1737–1794), and how Gibbon understood the cataclysm of decline and fall within the Roman Empire as an inevitable conflict between ancient virtue and modern commerce.  Gibbon, it turns out, evinces all the hallmarks of a bona fide civic humanist, even while composing his great "enlightened narrative". The first two volumes of Pocock's  six-volume magnum opus on Gibbon, Barbarism and Religion, won the American Philosophical Society's Jacques Barzun Prize in Cultural History for the year 1999.

The Cambridge School

Pocock is celebrated not merely as an historian, but as a pioneer of a new type of historical methodology: contextualism, i.e., the study of "texts in context".  In the 1960s and early '70s, he, (introducing "languages" of political thought) along with Quentin Skinner (focusing on authorial intention), and John Dunn (stressing biography), united informally to undertake this approach as the "Cambridge School" of the history of political thought.  Hereafter for the Cambridge School and its adherents, the then-reigning method of textual study, that of engaging a vaunted 'canon' of previously pronounced "major" political works in a typically anachronistic and disjointed fashion, simply would not do.

Pocock's "political languages" is the indispensable keystone of this historical revision.  Defined as "idioms, rhetorics, specialised vocabularies and grammars" considered as "a single though multiplex community of discourse", languages are uncovered (or discovered) in texts by historians who subsequently "learn" them in due course. The resultant familiarity produces a knowledge of how political thought can be stated in historically discovered "linguistic universes", and in exactly what manner all or parts of a text can be expressed. As examples, Pocock has cited the seventeenth- and eighteenth-century political languages of the "common law", "civil jurisprudence" and "classical republicanism", through which political writers such as James Harrington, Thomas Hobbes and John Locke reached their rhetorical goals.

In a new article in January 2019, Pocock answered parts of the criticism against the contextualism of the "Cambridge School": "The beginnings of the ‘global’ critique are well known and may as well be accepted as common ground. They reduce to the assertion that ‘Cambridge’ scholarship in this field is ‘Eurocentric’ [...] This is obviously true, and calls for reformation."

British history
From 1975, Pocock began advocating the development of a new subject which he called "British History" (also labelled "New British History", a title that Pocock has expressed his wish to shake off). Pocock coined the term Atlantic archipelago as a replacement for British Isles: "We should start with what I have called the Atlantic archipelagosince the term "British Isles" is one which Irishmen reject and Englishmen decline to take quite seriously". He also pressed his fellow historians to reconsider two issues linked to the future of British history. First, he urged historians of the British Isles to move away from histories of the Three Kingdoms (Scotland, Ireland, England) as separate entities, and he called for studies implementing a bringing-together or conflation of the national narratives into truly integrated enterprises. It has since become the commonplace preference of historians to treat British history in just that fashion. Second, he prodded policymakers to reconsider the Europeanisation of the UK still underway, via its entry into the European Union. In its abandonment of a major portion of national sovereignty purely from economic motives, that decision threw into question the entire matter of British sovereignty itself. What, Pocock asks, will (and must) nations look like if the capacity for and exercise of national self-determination is put up for sale to the highest bidder?

New Zealand
Alongside his ongoing work on Gibbon, has come a renewed attention to his nation of citizenship, New Zealand.  In a progression of essays published since 1991, Pocock explored the historical mandates and implications of the 1840 Treaty of Waitangi (between the British Crown and the indigenous Māori people) for Māori and the descendants of the original 19th-century European (but mainly British) settlers, known as Pākehā. Both parties have legitimate claims to portions of their national sovereignty.

Pocock concludes that the issue of New Zealand's sovereignty must be an ongoing shared experience, a perpetual debate leading to several ad hoc agreements if necessary, to which the Māori and Pākehā need to accustom themselves permanently. The alternative, an eventual rebirth of the violence and bloodshed of the 19th century New Zealand Wars, cannot and must not be entertained.

In the 2002 Queen's Birthday and Golden Jubilee Honours, Pocock was appointed an Officer of the New Zealand Order of Merit, for services to the history of political thought.

Monographs

Complete list of monographs:*
The Ancient Constitution and the Feudal Law: a study of English Historical Thought in the Seventeenth Century (1957, rept. 1987)**
The Maori and New Zealand Politics (Hamilton, Blackwood & Janet Paul: 1965) editor, co-author
Politics, Language and Time: Essays on Political Thought and History (Chicago: 1989, rept. 1972)
Obligation and Authority in Two English Revolutions: the Dr. W. E. Collins lecture delivered at the University on 17 May 1973 (Victoria University: 1973)
The Machiavellian Moment: Florentine Political Thought and the Atlantic Republican Tradition (Princeton: 1975, rept. 2003, 2016)
The Political Works of James Harrington (1977; 2 vol. set, 2010)** editor
John Locke : papers read at a Clark Library Seminar, 10 December 1977 (University of California: 1980) co-author
Three British Revolutions: 1641, 1688, 1776 (Princeton: 1980) editor, co-author
Virtue, Commerce and History: Essays on Political Thought and History Chiefly in the Eighteenth Century (1985)**
Edmund Burke: Reflections on the Revolution in France (Hackett: 1987) editor
Conceptual Change and the Constitution (University Press of Kansas: 1988) co-editor, co-author
James Harrington: The Commonwealth of Oceana and A System of Politics (1992)** editor
The Varieties of British Political Thought 1500–1800 (1993)** co-editor, co-author
Edward Gibbon: Bicentenary Essays (Voltaire Foundation: 1997) co-editor
Barbarism and Religion, vol.1: The Enlightenments of Edward Gibbon, 1737–1794 (1999)**
Barbarism and Religion, vol.2: Narratives of Civil Government (1999)**
Barbarism and Religion, vol.3: The First Decline and Fall (2003)**
Barbarism and Religion, vol.4: Barbarians, Savages and Empires (2005)**
Barbarism and Religion, vol.5: Religion: the First Triumph (2011)**
Barbarism and Religion, vol.6: Barbarism: Triumph in the West (2015)**
The Discovery of Islands: Essays in British History (2005)**
Political Thought and History: Essays on Theory and Method (2009)**
More than 260 published scholarly articles and reviews (as of January 2017). For a comprehensive listing, see The Work of J.G.A. Pocock.

* in the English language.
** Cambridge University Press.

Notes

Further reading

 Austrin, Terry, and John Farnsworth. "Assembling Histories: JGA Pocock, Aotearoa/New Zealand and the British World." History Compass 7.5 (2009): 1286–1302. online
 Bevir, Mark. "The Errors of Linguistic Contextualism", in History & Theory 31 (1992), 276–98.
 Boucher, David. Texts in Context. Revisionist Methods for Studying the History of Ideas, Dordrecht, Boston & Lancaster 1985.
 German, Daniel M.  "Pocock, J.G.A." in 
 Hampsher-Monk, Iain. "Political Languages in Time - the Work of JGA Pocock." British Journal of Political Science 14,01 (1984): 89–116.
 Hume, Robert D.  Pocock's Contextual Historicism, in D.N. DeLuna (ed.), The Political Imagination in History. Essays Concerning J.G.A. Pocock, Baltimore 2006, 27–55.
 James, Samuel. "JGA Pocock and the idea of the ‘Cambridge School’ in the history of political thought." History of European Ideas 45.1 (2019): 83-98. online
Pocock, John G. A. "A response to Samuel James’s ‘JGA Pocock and the Idea of the “Cambridge School” in the History of Political Thought’." History of European Ideas 45.1 (2019): 99-103.
 King, Preston. Historical Contextualism. The New Historicism?, in History of European Ideas 21 (1995), No. 2, 209–33.
 McBride, Ian. "JGA Pocock and the Politics of British History." in Four Nations Approaches to Modern 'British' History (Palgrave Macmillan, London, 2018) pp. 33–57.
 McCormick, John P. "Pocock, Machiavelli and political contingency in foreign affairs: Republican existentialism outside (and within) the city." History of European Ideas 43.2 (2017): 171–183.
 Richter, Melvin. "Reconstructing the history of political languages: Pocock, Skinner, and the Geschichtliche Grundbegriffe." History and theory 29.1 (1990): 38–70.
 Sheppard, Kenneth. "JGA Pocock as an Intellectual Historian." in A Companion to Intellectual History (2015): 113–125.
 Siegelberg, Mira L. "Things fall apart: JGA Pocock, Hannah Arendt, and the politics of time." Modern Intellectual History 10.1 (2013): 109–134.
 Suchowlansky, Mauricio, and Kiran Banerjee. "Foreword: The Machiavellian Moment Turns Forty." History of European Ideas 43.2 (2017): 125–128.
 Sullivan, Vickie B. "Machiavelli's momentary 'Machiavellian moment': A reconsideration of Pocock's treatment of the Discourses." Political Theory 20.2 (1992): 309–18.
 William Walker, J.G.A. Pocock and the History of British Political Thought. Assessing the State of the Art, in Eighteenth-Century Life 33 (2009), No. 1, 83–96.

1924 births
Living people
20th-century New Zealand historians
University of Canterbury alumni
Alumni of the University of Cambridge
Officers of the New Zealand Order of Merit
Academic staff of the University of Canterbury
Academic staff of the University of Otago
Johns Hopkins University faculty
Washington University in St. Louis faculty
Intellectual historians
Historians of political thought
Corresponding Fellows of the British Academy
British emigrants to New Zealand
New Zealand expatriates in the United States
Members of the American Philosophical Society
21st-century New Zealand historians